David W. Karnes (born ) is a United States Marine, who with fellow U.S. Marine Jason Thomas located and helped rescue two police officers of the Port Authority Police Department trapped in the rubble from the September 11 attacks after the collapse of the World Trade Center in 2001.

Career

2001: September 11 attacks
Karnes, an accountant by profession, left his office at Deloitte and Touche in Wilton, Connecticut, after witnessing the attacks on television. Karnes said to his co-workers, "You guys may not realize it, but this country is at war."

According to a Slate magazine profile, Karnes drove to a local church and asked the pastor and parishioners to say a prayer that God would lead him to survivors. A devout Christian, Karnes often turned to prayer when faced with decisions.

Having spent 23 years in the Marine Corps infantry, he got a regulation hair cut, put on his Marine Corps camouflage utility uniform, and obtained equipment that included rappelling gear. He drove from Connecticut to the World Trade Center to assist with the disaster. At the site, he ran into another Marine, Jason Thomas, and walked with him into the rubble. At the time, he only knew his fellow Marine as "Sgt. Thomas". His full identity was not discovered until five years later.

According to a Defense Department profile of Karnes:

The three men found Will Jimeno and John McLoughlin, a pair of police officers buried in the rubble. Karnes spent a total of nine days at the site before returning to his office. Upon returning home, he reenlisted in the Marine Corps Reserve and went on to serve in the Philippines and Iraq. He served for 17 months, including two tours of duty in Iraq.

In popular culture
In the 2006 Oliver Stone movie, World Trade Center, which tells this story, Karnes is played by Michael Shannon. Karnes did not cooperate in the making of Stone's World Trade Center movie due to Stone's antipathy towards U.S. President George W. Bush. Some critics took issue with the portrayal in the film. Rebecca Liss of Slate magazine observed, "The film seems to overplay his zeal without conveying his motivations and reasoning."  It notes he is unfairly portrayed as "a robotic soldier of Christ—a little wacky and simplistic."

See also

Dominick Pezzulo

References

1958 births
Living people
People from Wilton, Connecticut
People associated with the September 11 attacks
United States Marines
American accountants
Military personnel from Connecticut